Kyaw Win (born 1948) is a Burmese politician.

Kyaw Win may also refer to:
 Kyaw Win (general) (born 1944), Burmese military officer
 Kyaw Win (actor), the first winner of Myanmar Motion Picture Academy Awards
 Manutha Kyaw Win, Burmese writer
 Kyaw Khing Win (born 1983), Burmese football defender
 Kyaw Kyaw Win (born 1978), Burmese politician and lawyer
 Kyaw Zayar Win (born 1991), Burmese football midfielder